Atossa Leoni (born October 1977) is an actress who has been working internationally in film, television and theater since childhood.

Her mother is of Iranian descent, her father was born in Afghanistan and raised in Germany by his adoptive mother. Atossa was born in Berlin, Germany, has lived in Rome, Italy, and schooled in the United States. She is fluent in five languages and currently resides in New York City.

Atossa made her American screen debut starring as Soraya, the female lead in the film adaptation of The Kite Runner. The film is based on Khaled Hosseini's best-selling novel, which remained on The New York Times best-seller list for over 124 weeks. Directed by acclaimed filmmaker Marc Forster, the film has already received praise from critics and fans alike and is proving to be a major awards contender.

Atossa was seen in the critically praised America So Beautiful. The film, which also starred Academy Award nominee Shohreh Aghdashloo, followed a group of immigrants in Los Angeles during the unfolding of the 1979 Iran hostage crises. America So Beautiful was recognized at the Marrakech International Film Festival in 2002 and was in competition in the Panorama Section of the 2002 Berlin Film Festival.

She lent her voice to narrate the audiobook versions of Khaled Hosseini's A Thousand Splendid Suns and Greg Mortenson's Three Cups of Tea, as well as his follow-up Stones into Schools all of which are best-selling books around the world.

References

External links

OCPC Magazine cover story on Atossa Leoni

Hazara artists
German film actresses
German emigrants to the United States
Living people
1977 births
Actresses from Berlin
Actresses from Los Angeles
German people of Iranian descent
German voice actresses
Italian people of Iranian descent
Actresses from Rome
21st-century American women